Drink Masters is a 2022 reality television web series that premiered on Netflix on October 28, 2022.

Concept 
Twelve innovative mixologists face each other in a cocktail competition. They compete in a series of high-stakes cocktail challenges to win a life-changing prize and the title of "The Ultimate Drink Master".

Cast 

 Tone Bell, host
 Frankie Solarik, judge
 Julie Reiner, judge

Contestant progress

References

External links 

 

2020s American reality television series
2022 American television series debuts
English-language Netflix original programming
Cooking competitions in the United States
Food reality television series